SUPERAntiSpyware is a software application which can detect and remove spyware, adware, trojan horses, rogue security software, computer worms, rootkits, parasites and other potentially harmful software applications. Although it can detect various types of malware, SUPERAntiSpyware is not designed to replace antivirus software.

Details 
SUPERAntiSpyware's virus definitions are updated several times a week and generally receive a build update once a month. The company claims that it is specifically designed to be compatible with other security applications, such as Kaspersky, and can, therefore, be used even when those other applications are incompatible with other anti-spyware products.

The product is available as freeware for personal use with limited functions, such as no automatic update and scheduling and limited repair functions.

Reception 
In 2011, SUPERAntiSpyware received a "DISMAL" rating from PC Magazine, which complained that it had no real-time protection and the lowest detection rate and lowest score in a malware removal test. Both the freeware and commercial version received a 4 out of 5 star average user rating on CNET's Download.com website.

Acquisition 
On 16 July 2011, SUPERAntiSpyware was acquired by Support.com. The transaction was structured as an acquisition of assets with a cash purchase price of $8.5 million. All employees, including the founder, Nick Skrepetos, joined the acquirer.

References

External links

Spyware removal
Windows-only software
Windows security software